Flemming Niemann (born 7 August 1996) is a German footballer who plays for Schwarz-Weiß Rehden.

References

Living people
1996 births
Association football goalkeepers
German footballers
Arminia Bielefeld players
Karlsruher SC II players
FC Augsburg II players
FC Carl Zeiss Jena players
BSV Schwarz-Weiß Rehden players
3. Liga players
Oberliga (football) players
Regionalliga players
People from Minden
Sportspeople from Detmold (region)
Footballers from North Rhine-Westphalia